Tajuria cyrillus is a butterfly in the family Lycaenidae. It is found only on Sulawesi in Indonesia.

References

Butterflies described in 1865
Tajuria
Butterflies of Indonesia
Taxa named by William Chapman Hewitson